Anandalok Hospital is non-profit multi-specialty hospital located in Sector - II, Block - DK of Salt Lake City, Kolkata, India. The current Managing Director is Aditya Mukherjee. Anandalok Hospital is highly hailed as one of the least expensive hospital with proper facilities.

References

Hospitals in Kolkata
Healthcare in Kolkata
Year of establishment missing